Maya Alejandra Fernández Allende (born 27 September 1971, in Santiago de Chile) is a Chilean biologist, veterinarian and politician, a member of the Socialist Party of Chile (PS) who has been serving as Minister of National Defense of Chile since 11 March 2022. Since March 2018, she has served as a deputy of the Republic, representing the 10th district, Metropolitan Region. In her first legislative year, she presided over the Chamber of Deputies between March 2018 and March 2019.

Early life and education 
Born in Chile to Cuban diplomat Luis Fernández Oña and Beatriz Allende Bussi, she is a grandchild of the Chilean President Salvador Allende. She and her family had to emigrate to Cuba due to the military coup of 11 September 1973 against her grandfather, staying on the island until she was 21 years old. She returned to Chile in 1990, settling permanently in 1992. The same year she began studying biology at the University of Chile. She subsequently also studied veterinary medicine at the same university and obtained a BSc in both.

Political career 
In 1992 she joined the Socialist Party of Chile. In the 2008 municipal elections, she was elected councilor for the Nuñoa commune, which she stayed until 2012. During the Presidency of Milchelle Bachelet between 2006 and 2012, she worked in the Ministry of Foreign Relations. In the municipal elections of 2012, she ran for the mayorship of Ñuñoa for the Socialist Party on the Concertation list. The favorite to win the elections was Pedro Sabat, who had been serving as mayor of Nuñoa for the past 16 years. Fernandez at first won the elections by a slim margin of twenty votes, a result which was appealed by Sabat, who in turn came out victorious after a recount which gave him a thirty-vote lead.

Member of Parliament 
In the 2013 parliamentary elections, Fernández ran for the position of deputy for the 21st district, which includes the communes Nuñoa and Providencia from the metropolitan communes of Santiago. From 11 March 2014 to 11 March 2018, she represented the 21st district for the PS in the Chamber of Deputies. In the 2017 parliamentary elections, she was re-elected deputy, this time for the newly created 10th district of the Metropolitan Region. On the 11 March 2018, she became president of the Chamber of Deputies. She left office in March 2019.

Minister of Defense 
Since March 2022 Fernández serves as the Minister of Defense in the Cabinet of Gabriel Boric. Referring to the military coup her grandfather and former President of Chile was killed, she saw the role of the Chilean Military to defend Chile as a country and not to get involved in internal security.

Personal life 
She is the daughter of Cuban diplomat and politician of the Cuban Communist Party Luis Fernández Oña and surgeon Beatriz Allende Bussi, and the youngest granddaughter of former President Salvador Allende. She is also a niece to Senator Isabel Allende. Being a volunteer firefighter of Nuñoa, she is married to Tomás Monsalve Egaña and has two children.

References 

University of Chile alumni
Living people
People from Santiago Province, Chile
1971 births
Chilean people of Cuban descent
Presidents of the Chamber of Deputies of Chile
Members of the Chamber of Deputies of Chile
Socialist Party of Chile politicians
21st-century Chilean women politicians
21st-century Chilean politicians
Women members of the Chamber of Deputies of Chile
Chilean Ministers of Defense
Women government ministers of Chile
Female defence ministers
Allende family